John Sacré (born 4 October 1958) is a Canadian former field hockey player.

References

1958 births
Living people
Canadian male field hockey players
Pan American Games medalists in field hockey
Pan American Games gold medalists for Canada
Field hockey players at the 1983 Pan American Games
Field hockey players at the 1987 Pan American Games
Medalists at the 1983 Pan American Games
Medalists at the 1987 Pan American Games